Élvis Vieira Araújo (born 9 September 1990) is a Brazilian footballer who plays as an attacking midfielder.

Club career
Born in Janiópolis, Paraná, Élvis started his career at Paraná Clube. He made his first team debut on 27 January 2009, coming on as a substitute for Kleber in a 1–1 Campeonato Paranaense home draw against Paranavaí.

Élvis became a starter for the Tricolor during the 2010 Paranaense, and scored his first senior goal on 21 January of that year, netting the second of a 4–0 away routing of Engenheiro Beltrão. On 27 April, he moved to Botafogo on loan, but was assigned to the under-20 squad. 

Élvis was signed by Benfica on 12 January 2011, on a three-and-a-half-year contract. On 17 February, he moved to Atlético Goianiense on loan. At the latter club, he made his Série A debut on 26 June by playing the last 13 minutes of a 0–1 home loss against Vasco da Gama.

On 20 July 2011, Élvis joined União Leiria in Primeira Liga on a year-long loan deal. In a good individual year, he played 27 games and scored twice, but as the club was facing a severe economic crisis, he terminated his loan contract for unpaid salaries on 28 April 2012.

For the following seasons, Élvis was assigned to the reactivated Benfica B, making his debut in a 6–0 win against of Belenenses on 27 August 2012. After featuring rarely, he terminated his link and signed with Tombense in the Série D.

At Tombense, Élvis was first loaned to América Mineiro in 2013, but returned to Tombense the following year to help the team win their first-ever promotion to the Série C. His performances led to a move to Botafogo in 2015, winning the Taça Guanabara at Fogão.

On 6 January 2016, still owned by Tombense, Élvis signed with Criciúma. He finished 2016 at Figueirense, and joined Red Bull Brasil on a four-month contract for the 2017 season.

In April 2017, Élvis signed with CRB in the second tier. The following 2 January, he returned to Criciúma.

Élvis played the 2019 campaign at Oeste, being a regular starter as his side narrowly avoided relegation. On 26 December of that year, he agreed to a contract with Cuiabá.

On 16 April 2021, after helping Cuiabá to a first-ever promotion to the top tier, Élvis signed a two-year contract with Goiás, as the club paid his R$ 200,000 release clause. He also helped his new side on another top tier promotion in his first season.

Career statistics

Honours
Atlético Goianiense
 Campeonato Goiano: 2011

Tombense
 Campeonato Brasileiro Série D: 2014

Botafogo
Campeonato Brasileiro Série B: 2015

References

External links
 
 
 

1990 births
Living people
Brazilian footballers
Brazilian expatriate footballers
Association football midfielders
Primeira Liga players
Liga Portugal 2 players
Campeonato Brasileiro Série A players
Campeonato Brasileiro Série B players
Campeonato Brasileiro Série D players
Paraná Clube players
S.L. Benfica B players
U.D. Leiria players
Tombense Futebol Clube players
América Futebol Clube (MG) players
Botafogo de Futebol e Regatas players
Criciúma Esporte Clube players
Red Bull Brasil players
Figueirense FC players
Clube de Regatas Brasil players
Oeste Futebol Clube players
Cuiabá Esporte Clube players
Goiás Esporte Clube players
Associação Atlética Ponte Preta players
Expatriate footballers in Portugal
Brazilian expatriate sportspeople in Portugal